Strictly Rude is the fourth studio album from Boston ska punk act Big D and the Kids Table. The album peaked at 42 on Billboard's Top Heatseekers chart.

The album's title track is largely derived from Althea & Donna's "Uptown Top Ranking" which topped the UK charts in February 1978. While most of the song's lyrics have been rewritten to bear little semblance to the original version, the song's chorus sees the original line "Strictly Roots" changed to the track and album's title, "Strictly Rude".

Possibly the album's biggest hit, "Noise Complaint" rose to popularity based on its popular DIY music video.

Track listing

Chart positions

Personnel
David McWane - vocals, melodica
Sean P. Rogan - guitar, organ, piano, clavinet, vocals
Steve Foote - bass
Jon "JR" Reilly - drums, percussion, omnichord, vocals
Ryan O'Connor - saxophone, melodica, vocals
Dan Stoppelman - trumpet
Paul E. Cuttler - trombone
David and Alex - high-five on "Noise Complaint"
Paul Q. Kolderie - mixing, shaker on "Shining On"

References

2007 albums
SideOneDummy Records albums
Big D and the Kids Table albums